Hertford Castle Weir is a weir located in Hertford near to Hertford Castle and next to Hertford Theatre.

Its function is to connect the upper River Lea to the canalised section that runs through Hertfordshire, Essex and London, to the River Thames. The section of the river above Castle Weir is not deep enough to support barges or narrow boats, but is navigable by row boats, canoes and kayaks.

The weir marks the start of the River Lee Navigation. It is overlooked by a function room at the Hertford Theatre (previously called Castle Hall).

Access
Just off Mill Bridge (B158 road) in the centre of Hertford town, beside the Castle Hall.

A small bridge runs from Mill Bridge over the secondary drop to a car park. A step upstream from this bridge allows access to the top of the weir.

Angling
Angling in the weir pool is possible, but tricky due to pontoon access at the weir pool. Anglers often stand on the stepped weir drops, but this is discouraged due to the damage that is sustained to the weir itself.

Weir setup
Castle Weir has 3 sections:

 A vertical 70 cm drop onto a second 30 cm concrete block, situated in a stilling pool. The stilling pool overflows into a tunnel which leads under the road. The 70 cm drop has two electric gates which move vertically in high flows.
 5 padlocked sluice gates. Rarely used, as these are manually controlled by British Waterways.
 Stepped drop for high flows.

Whitewater use
Kayakers and canoeists regularly use the weir for practicing whitewater skills and playboating.

 Main drop - Can be run straight or sideways.
 Main drop sluice - Creates a jet which can tail squirts can be performed on. At high flows it makes the weir harder to paddle in, and can cause pinning in the stopper, river right.
 Stilling pool drop - Side-surfing is possible at most flows. Cartwheeling is possible when the pool level raises. Normally about 70 cm deep.
 Side sluice - A wave and stopper forms here, depending on weir pool levels and amount of water coming through the sluice. This water has been constricted by kayakers using concrete blocks to form different features. It can vary from 30–50 cm high wave which can be carved in front-surf, to a shallow retentive pour-over, which is side-surf able.
 Stepped drop - Can be run when river is in spate, very likely to do damage to the weir or your boat when the water flowing over it is less than 3 cm in depth. A small wave and stopper forms at the bottom which can be played on, however, it is very shallow.

See also
 Weirs on the River Lea
 River Lea
 River Lee Navigation

Weirs on the River Lea
Weirs in Hertfordshire
Buildings and structures in Hertford